O Dia do Galo ("The Day of Galo") is a 2014 Brazilian documentary film about the 2013 Copa Libertadores Finals. The film follows five supporters of Brazilian football club Atlético Mineiro in the day of the final match of the competition. It was released in Brazilian theatres on 24 July 2015.

Synopsis
Shot in Belo Horizonte, the city in which Clube Atlético Mineiro is based and the venue of the 2013 Copa Libertadores Finals, the documentary follows five supporters of the club (a priest, a bar owner, a sports broadcaster, a musician and a retired worker) in their preparations for the final match of the competition, which Atlético went on to win in dramatic fashion.

Production and release 
O Dia do Galo was directed by Cris Azzi with support from Coletivo Nitro and Alicate Filmes, totalling a crew of 50 people. It was initially released as a 22-minute short film and made available online, on YouTube, as a way to encourage club players and supporters in their preparation for the 2013 FIFA Club World Cup. In 2014, the documentary version was completed and screened in festivals, and it was released in Brazilian movie theatres on 24 July 2015 (exactly two years after the day it portrays). It was made available on Netflix in December 2015.

Reception 

The documentary was generally met with positive reviews. Pablo Villaça, film critic for Cinema em Cena, gave the film 4 stars out of 5, stating "it is less about Atlético itself than about the act of rooting [for a football team]". The film ended 2015 as one of the most watched Brazilian films of the year.

Awards
Popular Jury Award – Mostra de Cinema de Tiradentes
Cinefoot Belo Horizonte 2014

See also
2013 Copa Libertadores Finals

References

External links
 

2014 films
Documentary films about association football
Brazilian documentary films
2014 documentary films